The Asharaf, also spelled Ashraf (from the), is a Somali clan.

Belonging to the larger group of Somali clans living in the southern parts of the country called the Benadiri, they fall outside of the traditional Somali clan structures and are often marginalized within Somalia. As a minority, they have been the target of violent Islamist groups such as the al-Shabaab.

Contrary to most other Somali clans, who trace their ancestry to the prophet's cousin and Ali's older brother Aqil ibn Abi Talib, the Asharaf claim descent from Hasan and Husayn, the sons of Ali and Muhammad's daughter Fatima. Like the claims of other Somali clans in this regard, this alleged genealogy is historically untenable.

Clan structure 
The claimed genealogical structure of the Asharaf clan is as follows:

 Hasan ibn Ali
 Mohamed Sharif
 Sharif Ali 
 Sharif Ahmed 
 Ashraf Sarman
 Unnamed others
 Husayn ibn Ali
 Reer Sharif Magbuul
 Sharif Ahmed 
 Sharif Balaaw
 Unnamed others

Notable figures 
 Sharif Hassan
 Dada Masiti, Mana Sitti Habib Jamaladdin (Arabic: مانا ستي حبيب جمال الدين) (c. 1810s – 15 July 1919), commonly known as Dada Masiti ("Grandmother Masiti"), was an Ashraf poet, mystic and Islamic scholar. She composed her poetry in the Bravanese dialect spoken in Barawa.
 Sharif Aydurus, a famous scholar of Islamic and Somali history and pan-Islamic leader
 Shariif Imaankeey, Mayor of Mogadishu from September 19631965
 Shariif Caydaruus, Mayor of Mogadishu from 19661970

See also 

Demographics of Somalia
Samaale, legendary forefather of many other Somali clans, also claimed to be descended from the (wider) family of the prophet Muhammad
Sharif, the Arabic word from which the clan derives its name

References

Sources cited

Somali clans